The Kevich Light is a lighthouse located in the town of Grafton, Wisconsin.

This lighthouse was built privately by a person who has a general interest in lighthouses. It is built on the former site of the unincorporated community of Ulao, Wisconsin. It is listed on the USCG navigation maps as a private light. In 1990 it was officially registered as a United States Coast Guard Class II Private Aid Light. It is listed as light no. 20765. Its 1,000 and 400 watt bulbs are surrounded by a rotating shield, resulting in four seconds of light, and then four seconds of darkness. Kevich Light is believed to be one of the last few privately owned lights in the entire United States.

Notes

Further reading

 Havighurst, Walter (1943) The Long Ships Passing: The Story of the Great Lakes, Macmillan Publishers.
 Oleszewski, Wes, Great Lakes Lighthouses, American and Canadian: A Comprehensive Directory/Guide to Great Lakes Lighthouses, (Gwinn, Michigan: Avery Color Studios, Inc., 1998) .
 
 Sapulski, Wayne S., (2001) Lighthouses of Lake Michigan: Past and Present (Paperback) (Fowlerville: Wilderness Adventure Books) ; .
 Wright, Larry and Wright, Patricia, Great Lakes Lighthouses Encyclopedia Hardback (Erin: Boston Mills Press, 2006) .

External links

Lighthouses completed in 1981
Lighthouses in Wisconsin
Buildings and structures in Ozaukee County, Wisconsin
1981 establishments in Wisconsin